Events from 1919 in Catalonia.

Incumbents

 President of the Commonwealth of Catalonia – Josep Puig i Cadafalch

Events
 24 January – the Assembly of the Commonwealth of Catalonia approve the project of Statute of Autonomy of Catalonia, later repealed by the Spanish Cortes in Madrid.
 5 February – 16 March – La Canadiense strike paralyze the industry in Barcelona, achieving the first law limiting the working day to eight hours.

References